Adada is an ancient city and archaeological site in ancient Pisidia, north of Selge and east of Kestros River, near the village of Sağrak, in Isparta Province’s Sütçüler township. The location was identified as Karabavullu or Karabavli, about 35 km south of Lake Egridir.

Literature and archaeological evidence
The earliest evidence in ancient literature about the city is from the geographer Artemidorus of Ephesus, quoted by Strabo, who lists Adada among the ancient cities of Pisidia, confirmed by geographer Ptolemy. The name Adada is probably Pisidian. In ancient sources it is also mentioned  as Adadate and Odada, probably corruptions of the main name. Archaeological evidence of the name of the city is attested in an inscription of the second century BCE recording a treaty of friendship and alliance with Termessos.

The archaeological site
The Temple of the Emperors and Aphrodite, and the Temple of the Emperors and Zeus Sarapis are included in visible ruins of the archaeological site. There is also a well-preserved stairway leading from the agora to a tower and other buildings, probably the acropolis of the city. There are also standing buildings of different types

Numismatics
There are two periods of coinage in Adada
 As an independent city during the Late Hellenistic period, when first coins were minted, dated to the 1st century BCE.
 As a subjugated city in the Roman Empire. The imperial coinage began during the reign of Trajan (98-117) and stopped during the reign of Valerian and Gallienus (253-268).

Religion
On the basis of the iconographic types of portraiture in coins, the worship of Zeus, Dionysus, Artemis (Pergaia), Athena and Hygieia is attested. Furthermore, attested also is the heroic cult of Heracles, of Dioscuri and Asclepius, as well as the imperial cult.

Episcopal See
In the Byzantine era the city was an episcopal see attached to Antioch. No longer the seat of a residential bishop, it remains a titular see of the Roman Catholic Church.

References

History of Isparta Province
Ancient Greek archaeological sites in Turkey
Populated places in Pisidia
Roman towns and cities in Turkey
Catholic titular sees in Asia
Former dioceses in Asia
Populated places of the Byzantine Empire
Sütçüler District